Andreas Menger (born 11 September 1972 in West Berlin) is a former German football player and currently goalkeeping coach of Hertha BSC.

The netminder played in German professional football between 1997 until 2005. But merely in his first season at the Cologne side he assured a regular spot. After the Billy Goats relegated, he had only eight appearances. In winter of the 1998–99 season, he was transferred to MSV Duisburg. While playing twelve times with the Zebras, he never played in one game when he was under contract for Frankfurt. Nevertheless, the executives were convinced of his abilities and from 2005 to 2011 he was the goalkeeping coach of the eagles, after splitting his duties between being a stand-by goalkeeper and coaching the keepers.

In July 2011, Menger became new goalkeeping coach of VfB Stuttgart. On 8 January 2013, Menger extended his contract with VfB Stuttgart until June 2016. Since January 2018, Menger has been the goalkeeping coach of 1. FC Köln.

References 

1972 births
Living people
Footballers from Berlin
German footballers
Association football goalkeepers
Tennis Borussia Berlin players
SSV Ulm 1846 players
SpVgg Greuther Fürth players
1. FC Köln players
MSV Duisburg players
Eintracht Frankfurt players
Bundesliga players
2. Bundesliga players
Eintracht Frankfurt non-playing staff
VfB Stuttgart non-playing staff
1. FC Köln non-playing staff